Caracase is a town in the southwestern Gedo region of Somalia.

References
Caracase

Populated places in Gedo